The Toboggan was a steel roller coaster located at Conneaut Lake Park in Conneaut Lake, Pennsylvania. Purchased from a previous owner in Texas, the ride opened at the park in 2002, operating until 2006. It was located near the midway area of the park, close to the site of the former Dreamland Ballroom. After standing inactive for nearly a decade, the roller coaster was dismantled and moved into storage following the 2014 season.

The ride 
A Toboggan is a portable roller coaster that was manufactured by Chance Industries from 1969 to the mid-1970s. The coaster features a small vehicle, holding two people, that climbs vertically inside a hollow steel tower then spirals back down around the same tower. There is a small section of track at the base of the tower with a few small dips and two turns to bring the ride vehicle back to the station. Each vehicle has a single rubber tire with a hydraulic clutch braking system that governs the speed of the vehicle as it descends the tower. The rubber tire engages a center rail that begins halfway through the first spiral. The ride stands 45 feet tall with a track length of 450 feet. A typical ride lasts approximately 70 seconds.

References

Former roller coasters in Pennsylvania
2002 establishments in Pennsylvania